John Fauconer (fl. 1421) was an English politician who was a Member (MP) of the Parliament of England for Devizes in December 1421.

References

Year of birth missing
Year of death missing
English MPs December 1421
People from Devizes